Khövsgöl is a sum (district) of Dornogovi Province in south-eastern Mongolia. In 2009, its population was 1,531.

References 

Districts of Dornogovi Province